The 2005-06 Cupa României was the 3rd annual Romanian women's football knockout tournaments.

Quarterfinals

Semifinals

Final

References

Rom
Fem
Rom
Women's sport in Romania